Hădărăuți is a village in Ocnița District, Moldova.

Notable people
 Oleg Serebrian 
 Ion Ciubuc 
 Vitalie Tonu

References

Villages of Ocnița District
Khotinsky Uyezd